The Office of Special Affairs (OSA), formerly the Guardian's Office, is a department of the Church of Scientology International. According to the Church, the OSA is responsible for directing legal affairs, public relations, pursuing investigations, publicizing the Church's "social betterment works," and "oversee[ing its] social reform programs". Some observers outside the Church have characterized the department as an intelligence agency, comparing it variously to the CIA or the KGB.  The department has targeted critics of the Church with dead agent operations and character assassination.

OSA is the successor to the now-defunct Guardian's Office, which was responsible for Operation Snow White and Operation Freakout; both are in Department 20 in the Scientology organizational chart.  The most recent head of OSA International was Mike Rinder, who has since departed from the organization and criticizes it severely, appearing as a co-host on Leah Remini: Scientology and the Aftermath.

Structure and personnel 
At local Scientology organizations, directors (Special Affairs, Legal, Public Affairs) are OSA staff members. Local Directors of Special Affairs are known as DSAs.  Members of the Office of Special Affairs are drawn from the Sea Org.

In addition to regular staff, some church members also act as volunteer collaborators for the office, which cuts down on private investigation and legal research expenses. Some volunteers participate under the notion that they receive special "ethics protection". In one case a volunteer who read critical information about Scientology on the internet was led to believe that he would be unable to continue receiving services unless he performed a series of investigations for OSA.

History 
The Guardian's Office was established in 1966, and its initial mission was to protect the interests of the Church of Scientology, and gather information on agencies and individuals deemed enemies of the organization.  The Guardian's Office was also charged with internal monitoring of current Scientologists, in particular heretics and notable defectors.  L. Ron Hubbard put his wife Mary Sue Hubbard in charge of the Guardian's Office, and it was initially headquartered at Saint Hill Manor, in England.  The Guardian's Office functioned effectively as an Intelligence Bureau of the Church of Scientology, and planted members in key positions within federal government agencies, in order to obtain confidential material.  Most branches of the Church of Scientology soon had at least one member from the Guardian's Office on its staff, and the Guardian's Office itself had its own secret Intelligence Bureau at the top of its organizational structure.  The Guardian's Office was disbanded in 1983, and the bulk of its previous functions were then assigned to the Office of Special Affairs.

Methods 
Garry Scarff has said that he used to be an OSA operative.  He has made a number of  statements about the inner workings of OSA, many of which are disputed by the Church.  In a sworn deposition taken between July and August 1993 and submitted in Church of Scientology International vs. Steven Fishman and Uwe Geertz, Scarff testified, "...I was directed, one, to go to Chicago, Illinois and to murder Cynthia Kisser, Cynthia Kisser being the Executive Director of the Cult Awareness Network, by a staged car accident." Kisser was not killed, and Scarff said: "I could not bring myself to harm or kill anybody."

Tory Christman, a former volunteer for OSA has stated that the organization hired private investigators, fabricated criminal charges and harassed their targets, including at their place of employment, as well as their family members.

Bonnie Woods, a former member who began counselling people involved with Scientology and their families, became a target along with her husband in 1993 when the Church of Scientology started a leaflet operation denouncing her as a "hate campaigner" with demonstrators outside their home and around East Grinstead. She and her family were followed by a private investigator, and a creditor of theirs was located and provided free legal assistance to sue them into bankruptcy. After a long battle of libel suits, in 1999 the church agreed to issue an apology and pay £55,000 damages and £100,000 costs to the Woods.

Nancy Many was a high-level GO operative during Operation Freakout, and in a 2013 television interview for Dangerous Persuasions on the Discovery Channel, described intimate details of the operation to harass Paulette Cooper, including her own personal involvement. In the documentary she also explicitly confirmed the existence of "The Messianic Program", a GO interrogation program designed specifically to test the subjects reaction to the teaching that L. Ron Hubbard was "on level with Jesus and Buddha". This program was only ever administered to trusted GO agents by their superiors, and never to outside Scientologists, indicating its extremely classified nature.

Among the targets of OSA operations are Free Zone groups.

See also
 Fair Game (Scientology)
 Intelligence agency
 List of Guardian's Office operations
 Suppressive Person

References

External links 

 Office of Special Affairs
 OSA (Office of Special Affairs) -- The Secret CIA of Scientology from Understanding Scientology by Margery Wakefield
 Scientology's Secret Service: Inside Scientology's Intelligence Agencies (xenu.net)
 Scientology's Secret Service: The Office of Special Affairs (1983 to present) (xenu.net)
 Hubbard Communications Office "Manual of Justice"
 Deceived; One woman's stand against the Church of Scientology, Bonnie Woods, London: Published by Hodder & Houghton. 2001. 
 Office of Special Affairs investigator training

Scientology organizations
Scientology-related controversies
Intelligence agencies
Hemet, California
Religion in Riverside County, California

fr:Scientologie#Office des affaires spéciales